Armenian is a Unicode block containing characters for writing the Armenian language, both the traditional Western Armenian and reformed Eastern Armenian orthographies.  Five Armenian ligatures are encoded in the Alphabetic Presentation Forms block.

Block

History
The following Unicode-related documents record the purpose and process of defining specific characters in the Armenian block:

References 

Unicode blocks